Ma. Deanna Izabella Alvizo Wong (born July 18, 1998) is a Filipino professional volleyball athlete. Wong was a member of the Ateneo de Manila University Lady Blue Eagles, the school's women's varsity volleyball team from 2016 to 2020. During Season 80 of the University Athletic Association of the Philippines (UAAP) in 2018, she won the Best Setter Award.

While being a part of the team, Ateneo was the UAAP runner-up in 2016 and 2017, won bronze in 2018, and became the champions in 2019. The team, in partnership with Motolite, also reached the finals in the Premier Volleyball League Season 2 Open Conference in 2018.

In June 2020, she was signed by the Choco Mucho Flying Titans.

Personal life 
She studied at the Saint Theresa's College of Cebu in elementary and attended the University of San Jose–Recoletos for high school. In college, she took up AB Interdisciplinary Studies at the Ateneo de Manila University.

Volleyball 
She first started playing indoor volleyball in her sixth grade intramural upon her best friend's invitation and continued to play the sport in high school. She then was invited for a three-week training at the San Sebastian College-Recoletos and the Ateneo de Manila University.

UAAP 
By March 2015, she was picked as member of the collegiate varsity women's volleyball team of the Ateneo de Manila University, under then head coach Anusorn "Tai" Bundit and became a rookie in the 2016 UAAP Season 78. She played as a libero in 2017 Season 79 and then as setter the next year for 2018 Season 80, during which she was awarded the Best Setter award. While the team settled for bronze in the previous season, the Ateneo Lady Eagles won the championship for UAAP Season 81 in 2019.

Wong took a hiatus from playing for Ateneo for Season 82. She was set to return in UAAP Season 83 which was cancelled due to the COVID-19 pandemic. Wong is still eligible to compete in UAAP Season 84 but chose to play for Premier Volleyball League.

PVL 
Wong played in the 2019 Premier Volleyball League Season 2 Open Conference with Ateneo de Manila University, in partnership with Motolite, and the team reached the finals but were defeated by the Creamline Cool Smashers. In 2021, Wong played in Season 4 Open Conference with Choco Mucho Flying Titans, the team owned by Republic Biscuit Corporation.

Choco Mucho (AVC) 
Wong was also part of the Philippine women's national team which competed as the club side, Team Choco Mucho at the 2021 Asian Women's Club Volleyball Championship.

National Team 
Wong is also part of Philippines women's national volleyball team and she was supposed to play in SEA Games 2021 in Quang Ninh,Vietnam.

Awards 
On October 2, 2018, she was one of the nominees for Push Sports Personality of the Year.

Individual 
 2018 UAAP Season 80 Indoor Volleyball Best Setter

Collegiate 
 2016 UAAP Season 78 Indoor Volleyball –  Silver with Ateneo de Manila Lady Eagles
 2017 UAAP Season 79 Indoor Volleyball –  Silver with Ateneo de Manila Lady Eagles
 2018 UAAP Season 80 Indoor Volleyball –  Bronze with Ateneo de Manila Lady Eagles
 2019 UAAP Season 81 Indoor Volleyball –  Champion with Ateneo de Manila Lady Eagles

Club 
 2019 PVL Open Conference Season 2 –  Silver with Ateneo-Motolite

References 

1998 births
Living people
University Athletic Association of the Philippines volleyball players
Sportspeople from Cebu
University of San Jose–Recoletos alumni
Ateneo de Manila University alumni
Filipino women's volleyball players
Liberos
Setters (volleyball)